Guillermo Gastón Acosta (born 31 October 1988) is an Argentine footballer who plays right winger, midfielder or extreme right. He currently plays for Atlético Tucumán.

References

External links

Living people
1988 births
Argentine footballers
Association football wingers
Argentine Primera División players
Primera Nacional players
Juventud Unida de Gualeguaychú players
Club Social y Deportivo La Florida players
Atlético Tucumán footballers
San Jorge de Tucumán footballers
Club Atlético Lanús footballers
Sportspeople from Tucumán Province